

Events

January

 January 8 – Three bombs explode in Moscow within 37 minutes, killing seven. The bombings are attributed to an Armenian separatist group.
 January 10 – Mount Nyiragongo erupts in eastern Zaire (now the Democratic Republic of the Congo).
 January 17 
 January 18
 Scientists identify a previously unknown bacterium as the cause of the mysterious Legionnaires' disease.
 Australia's worst railway disaster at Granville, a suburb of Sydney, leaves 83 people dead.
 SFR Yugoslavia Prime minister Džemal Bijedić, his wife and 6 others are killed in a plane crash in Bosnia and Herzegovina.
 January 19 – An Ejército del Aire CASA C-207C Azor (registration T.7-15) plane crashes into the side of a mountain near Chiva, on approach to Valencia Airport in Spain, killing all 11 people on board.
 January 20 – Jimmy Carter is sworn in as the 39th President of the United States.
 January 23 – Prime Minister Indira Gandhi of India calls for fresh elections to the Lok Sabha, and releases all political prisoners.
 January 24 – The Massacre of Atocha occurs, during the Spanish transition to democracy.

February
 February 2 – The Congress Party of India, led by Indira Gandhi, splits with Jagjivan Ram and other senior leaders, forming Congress for Democracy. This party later merges with the Janata Party.
 February 3 – In northern Japan a blizzard piles snow on rooftops, causing many to collapse killing at least 31 people.
 February 4 – Eleven CTA commuters are killed when an elevated train derails from the Loop in central Chicago, United States. 
 February 7 – The Soviet Union launches Soyuz 24 (Viktor Gorbatko, Yury Glazkov) to dock with the Salyut 5 space station.
 February 18 – American Space Shuttle program: First test flight of Space Shuttle Enterprise mated to the Boeing 747 Shuttle Carrier Aircraft.
 February 23 – Óscar Romero, an outspoken opponent of violence, becomes Archbishop of San Salvador, El Salvador.
 February 28 – Queen Elizabeth II opens the Parliament of New Zealand.

March
 March 4 – The 1977 Vrancea earthquake in the Vrancea Mountains of Romania kills 1,500.
 March 8 – The Australian parliament is opened by Elizabeth II in her capacity as Queen of Australia.
 March 9 – Hanafi Siege: Approximately a dozen armed Hanafi Movement members take over 3 buildings in Washington, D.C., killing 1 person and taking more than 130 hostages (the hostage situation ends 2 days later).
 March 10 – The rings of Uranus are discovered.
 March 12 – The Centenary Test between Australia and England begins at the Melbourne Cricket Ground.
 March 19 – Results of elections to the Indian Parliament are declared. Indira Gandhi's Congress Party is routed by the opposition Janata alliance.
 March 21 – Prime Minister Indira Gandhi withdraws the state of emergency which was implemented on June 25, 1975.
 March 27 – Tenerife disaster: A collision between KLM and Pan Am Boeing 747s at Tenerife, Canary Islands, kills 583 people. This becomes the deadliest accident in aviation history.

April
 April 2 – Horse racing: Red Rum wins a record third Grand National at Aintree Racecourse in the UK.
 April 4 – Southern Airways Flight 242 crashes on a highway in New Hope, Georgia, United States, killing 72 people.
 April 7 – German Federal Prosecutor Siegfried Buback and his driver are shot by Red Army Faction members while waiting at a red light near his home in Karlsruhe. The "Ulrike Meinhof Commando" later claims responsibility.

 April 9 – Spain legalizes the Communist Party of Spain, which had been outlawed since 1939.
 April 11 – London Transport's Silver Jubilee AEC Routemaster buses are launched.
 April 17 – Belgian Prime Minister Leo Tindemans' Christian Social Party gains eight seats in the lower house in parliamentary elections.
 April 18 - An annular solar eclipse was visible in Africa, and was the 29th solar eclipse of Solar Saros 138.
 April 22 – Optical fiber is first used to carry live telephone traffic.
 April 24 – In northern Bangladesh, a cyclone kills 13 people and injures about 100 others.
 April 28 – A federal court in Stuttgart, West Germany, sentences Red Army Faction members Andreas Baader, Gudrun Ensslin, and Jan-Carl Raspe to life imprisonment.
 April 30 – The Cold War between Cambodia and Vietnam evolves into the Cambodian–Vietnamese War.

May

 May 1 – The Taksim Square massacre in Istanbul results in 34 deaths and hundreds of injuries.
 May 12 – Portugal and Israel establish diplomatic relations.
 May 14
 The 1977 IAS Cargo Boeing 707 airplane crash in Lusaka, Zambia kills all six on board.
 In Milan, Italy, during a far-left demonstration, a hooded person shoots at the police, killing a policeman, Antonio Custra. The scene is photographed and the picture of the hooded man shooting in the middle of the street appears in many magazines around the world.
 The Montreal Canadiens sweep the Boston Bruins in four games to win their second straight Stanley Cup.
 May 16 – A 20-passenger S-61L topples sideways at takeoff from the roof of the Pan Am Building in Midtown Manhattan. Four passengers are killed by the turning rotors and a woman at street level is killed by a falling blade.
 May 17 – The Likud Party, led by Menachem Begin, wins the national elections in Israel.
 May 23
 Scientists report using bacteria in a lab to make insulin via gene splicing.
 Moluccan terrorists take over a school in Bovensmilde, northern Netherlands (105 hostages), and a passenger train on the Bovensmilde–Assen route nearby (90 hostages) at the same time. On June 11, Dutch Royal Marines storm the train, and six terrorists and two hostages are killed.
 May 27
 The 1977 Aeroflot Ilyushin 62 airplane crash in Cuba kills 69 people.
 A demonstration and coup attempt in Angola takes place. Thousands are killed by the government and Cuban forces.
 May 28 – The Beverly Hills Supper Club in Southgate, Kentucky, is engulfed in fire; 165 are killed inside.
 May 29 – Indianapolis 500: A. J. Foyt becomes the first driver to win the race four times.

June

 June 5 – A bloodless coup installs France-Albert René as President of the Seychelles.
 June 10 – The first Apple II series computers go on sale.
 June 15 – Spain has its first democratic elections, after 41 years of Francoist Spain.
 June 21 – Bülent Ecevit, of CHP forms the new government of Turkey (40th government since the founding of the Turkish republic, but fails to receive the vote of confidence).
 June 25 – The 1977 Rugby League World Cup culminates in Australia's 13–12 victory over Great Britain at the Sydney Cricket Ground before about 24,450 spectators.
 June 27 – Djibouti receives its independence from France.
 June 30 – The Southeast Asia Treaty Organization is permanently disbanded.

July
 July 1
 The East African Community is dissolved.
 The Championships, Wimbledon (tennis) – Virginia Wade wins the women's singles title in the centenary year of the tournament, Wade's first and only Wimbledon title and her third and final Grand Slam title overall; she remains the last British woman to win the singles title at Wimbledon.
 July 5 – General Muhammad Zia-ul-Haq overthrows Zulfikar Ali Bhutto, the first elected Prime Minister of Pakistan.
 July 9 – The Pinochet dictatorship in Chile organises the youth event of Acto de Chacarillas, a ritualised act reminiscent of Francoist Spain.
 July 13
 Somalia declares war on Ethiopia, starting the Ethio-Somali War. 
 New York City is affected by a complete electricity blackout lasting through the following day that results in citywide looting and other criminal activity, including arson.
 July 21 – 24 – The Libyan–Egyptian War, sparked by a Libyan raid on Sallum, begins.
 July 21 – Süleyman Demirel, of AP forms the new government of Turkey (41st government a three-party coalition, so-called second national front).
 July 22 – The purged Chinese Communist leader Deng Xiaoping is restored to power nine months after the "Gang of Four" was expelled from power in a coup d'état.
 July 27 – The Soviet Politburo orders Boris Yeltsin to demolish the Ipatiev House, where Tsar Nicholas II of Russia and his family were shot in 1918. Yeltsin eventually calls this a barbarian act.
 July 30 – Left-wing German terrorists Susanne Albrecht, Brigitte Mohnhaupt and Christian Klar assassinate Jürgen Ponto, chairman of the Dresdner Bank in Oberursel, West Germany.

August
 August 3
 United States Senate hearings on Project MKUltra are held.
 The Tandy Corporation TRS-80 Model I computer is announced at a press conference.
 August 4 – U.S. President Jimmy Carter signs legislation creating the United States Department of Energy.
 August 9 – The military-controlled government of Uruguay announces that it will return the nation to civilian rule through general elections in 1981 for a President and Congress.
 August 12 – The NASA Space Shuttle, named Enterprise, makes its first test free-flight from the back of a Boeing 747 Shuttle Carrier Aircraft.
 August 15
 The Big Ear, a radio telescope operated by Ohio State University as part of the SETI project, receives a radio signal from deep space; the event is named the Wow! signal for a notation made by a volunteer on the project.
 Herbert Kappler escapes from the Caelian Hill military hospital in Rome.
 August 17 – The Soviet icebreaker Arktika becomes the first surface ship to reach the North Pole.
 August 20 – Voyager program: The United States launches the Voyager 2 spacecraft.
 August 26 – The National Assembly of Quebec passes the Charter of the French Language (Law 101, La charte de la langue française) making French the official language of the Canadian province of Quebec.

September 
 September 4 – The Golden Dragon massacre takes place in San Francisco, United States.
 September 5
 Voyager program: Voyager 1 is launched after a brief delay.
 German Autumn: Employers Association President Hanns Martin Schleyer is kidnapped in Cologne, West Germany. The kidnappers kill three escorting police officers and his chauffeur. They demand the release of Red Army Faction prisoners.
 September 7 – Treaties between Panama and the United States on the status of the Panama Canal are signed. The U.S. agrees to transfer control of the canal to Panama at the end of the 20th century.
 September 8 – Interpol issues a resolution against the copyright infringement of video tapes and other material, which is still cited in warnings on opening pre-credits of videocassettes and DVDs.
 September 10 – Hamida Djandoubi's is the last guillotine execution in France (at Marseille) and the last legal beheading in the western world.
 September 11 – Atari, Inc. releases its Video Computer System in North America.
 September 18 – Courageous (U.S.), skippered by Ted Turner, sweeps the Australian challenger Australia in the 24th America's Cup yacht race.
 September 19 
 Under pressure from the Carter Administration, President of Nicaragua Anastasio Somoza Debayle lifts the state of siege in Nicaragua.
 North Korean agents abduct Yutaka Kume from Noto Peninsula starting the North Korean abductions of Japanese citizens.
 September 20 – The Petrozavodsk phenomenon is observed in the Soviet Union and some northern European countries.
 September 28 – The Porsche 928 debuts at the Geneva Motor Show.

October 
 October 1 – Energy Research and Development Administration combines with the Federal Energy Administration to form United States Department of Energy.
 October 7
 The Soviet Union adopts its third Constitution. The Soviet National Anthem's lyrics are returned after a 24-year period, with Joseph Stalin's name omitted.
 Pelé plays his final professional football game, as a member of the New York Cosmos.
 October 13 – German Autumn: Four Palestinians hijack Lufthansa Flight 181 to Somalia and demand the release of 11 Red Army Faction members.
 October 17 – 18 – German Autumn: GSG 9 troopers storm the hijacked Lufthansa passenger plane in Mogadishu, Somalia; three of the four hijackers die.
 October 18
 German Autumn: Red Army Faction members Andreas Baader, Jan-Carl Raspe and Gudrun Ensslin commit suicide in Stammheim prison; Irmgard Möller fails (their supporters still claim they were murdered). They are buried on October 27.
 October 19 – German Autumn: Kidnapped industrialist Hanns Martin Schleyer is found murdered in Mulhouse, France.
 October 20 – Three members of the rock band Lynyrd Skynyrd die in a charter plane crash outside Gillsburg, Mississippi, three days after the release of their fifth studio album Street Survivors.
 October 21 – The European Patent Institute is founded.
 October 23 – The president of Catalonia, Josep Tarradellas, returns to Barcelona from exile and the autonomous government of Catalonia, the Generalitat, is restored.
 October 26
 The last natural smallpox case is discovered in Merca district, Somalia. The WHO and the CDC consider this date the anniversary of the eradication of smallpox, a great success of vaccination and, by extension, of modern science.
 Space Shuttle program: Last test taxi flight of Space Shuttle Enterprise, over California.
 October 27 – British punk band Sex Pistols release Never Mind the Bollocks, Here's the Sex Pistols on the Virgin Records label. Despite refusal by major retailers in the UK to stock it, it enters the UK Album Charts at number one the week after its release.
 October 28 –  Hong Kong police attack the ICAC headquarters.

November 
 November 1 – 2060 Chiron, first of the outer Solar System asteroids known as Centaurs, is discovered by Charlie Kowal.

 November 2 – The worst storm in Athens' modern history causes havoc across the Greek capital and kills 38 people.
 November 6 – The Kelly Barnes Dam, located above Toccoa Falls Bible College near Toccoa, Georgia, United States, fails, killing 39 people.
 November 8
 Greek archaeologist Manolis Andronikos discovers the tomb of Philip II of Macedon at Vergina.
 San Francisco elects City Supervisor Harvey Milk, the first openly gay elected official of any large city in the U.S.
 November 9 – Gen. Hugo Banzer, president of the military government of Bolivia, announces that the constitutional democracy will be restored in 1978 instead of 1980 as previously provided.
 November 10 – The soundtrack to Saturday Night Fever is released.  Featuring five new Bee Gees compositions, it will go on to become the then best selling album of all time.
 November 19
 Egyptian President Anwar Sadat becomes the first Arab leader to make an official visit to Israel, when he meets with Israeli Prime Minister Menachem Begin, seeking a permanent peace settlement.
 TAP Portugal Flight 425 crashes at Madeira Airport, Funchal, Portugal, killing 131 and leaving 33 survivors.
 November 22
 British Airways inaugurates regular London to New York City supersonic Concorde service.
 The TCP/IP test succeeds, connecting 3 ARPANET nodes (of 111), in what eventually becomes the Internet protocol.
 November 30 – The International Fund for Agricultural Development (IFAD) is founded as a specialized agency of the United Nations.

December 
 December – The Colombo Plan for Co-operative Economic and Social Development in Asia and the Pacific (CESDAP) is implemented.
 December 4
 Jean-Bédel Bokassa, president of the Central African Republic, crowns himself Emperor.
 Malaysian Airline System Flight 653 is hijacked and crashes in Tanjung Kupang, Johor, Malaysia, killing all 100 passengers and crew on board.
 December 6 – South Africa grants independence to Bophuthatswana, although it is not recognized by any other country.
 December 10 – 1977 Australian federal election: Malcolm Fraser's Liberal/National Country Coalition Government is re-elected with a slightly reduced majority, defeating the Labor Party led by former Prime Minister Gough Whitlam. Consequently, Whitlam resigned as ALP leader after holding the job for nearly 11 years; he would be replaced by former Treasurer Bill Hayden.
 December 13 – a chartered Douglas DC-3 aircraft carrying the University of Evansville basketball team to Nashville, Tennessee, crashes in rain and dense fog about 90 seconds after takeoff from Evansville Regional Airport; 29 people die in the crash, including 14 members of the team and head coach Bob Watson.
 December 16 – Saturday Night Fever is released in theaters and becomes the biggest dancing movie of all time. The movie launches the career of its star John Travolta and catapults the Bee Gees — who performed several songs on the soundtrack — to newfound success.
 December 18 – SA de Transport Aérien Flight 730, an international charter service from Zurich to Funchal Airport (Madeira), hits the sea during a landing attempt. Many of the 36 who die drown, trapped inside the sinking aircraft. Twenty-one people survive with the help of rescuers and by swimming to the shore.
 December 19 – The  5.9 Bob–Tangol earthquake rocks Iran, killing at least 584 people and injuring 1,000.
 December 20 – Djibouti and Vietnam join the United Nations.
 December 22 – A grain elevator explodes in Westwego, Louisiana, United States, killing 36 people.

Births

January

 January 1 
 Hasan Salihamidžić, Bosnian footballer
 Jerry Yan, Taiwanese singer
 January 3 – Mayumi Iizuka, Japanese voice actress
 January 4 – Irán Castillo, Mexican actress and singer 
 January 11 
 Anni Friesinger-Postma, German speed skater
 Devin Ratray, American actor
 January 13 – Orlando Bloom, British actor
 January 14 – Narain Karthikeyan, Indian Formula One driver
 January 15 – Giorgia Meloni, Italian politician
 January 17 – Leigh Whannell, Australian actor and writer
 January 20 – Melody, Belgian singer
 January 21 – Jerry Trainor, American actor, comedian and musician
 January 22 – Hidetoshi Nakata, Japanese footballer
 January 23 – Kamal Heer, Punjabi singer and musician
 January 24 – Johann Urb, Estonian-born American actor
 January 25
 Christian Ingebrigtsen, Norwegian singer

 Hatem Trabelsi, Tunisian footballer
 January 26
 Nicholaus Arson, Swedish guitarist and songwriter 
 Vince Carter, American basketball player
 January 28 – Takuma Sato, Japanese racing driver
 January 31 – Kerry Washington, African-American actress

February

 February 2 – Shakira, Colombian singer-songwriter and musician
 February 3 – Daddy Yankee, Puerto Rican singer
 February 5 – Ben Ainslie, British sailor
 February 7 – Mariusz Pudzianowski, Polish strongman
 February 11 – Mike Shinoda, American musician, singer and rapper
 February 18
 Ike Barinholtz, American actor, comedian and screenwriter
 László Nemes, Hungarian film director and screenwriter
 February 19 – Gianluca Zambrotta, Italian footballer
 February 20
 Stephon Marbury, American basketball player
 Gail Kim, Canadian professional wrestler and actress
 February 21 
 Cyrine Abdelnour, Lebanese singer, actress, and model
 Jonathan Safran Foer, American author
 Steve Francis, American basketball player
 February 23 – Kristina Šmigun-Vähi, Estonian skier
 February 24 – Floyd Mayweather Jr., American boxing champion
 February 25 – Hakan Yakin, Turkish football player and coach
 February 26
 Olsi Baze, columnist, writer and human rights activist.
 Shane Williams, Welsh rugby player
 February 28 
 Jason Aldean, American country music singer
 Rafael Amaya, Mexican model, singer, and actor

March

 March 1 – Rens Blom, Dutch athlete
 March 2 – Chris Martin, British rock musician 
 March 3 – Ronan Keating, Irish singer 
 March 4 – Ana Guevara, Mexican track and field athlete and politician
 March 5 – Wally Szczerbiak, Spanish-born basketball player
 March 6
 Paquillo Fernández, Spanish race walker
 Santino Marella, Canadian professional wrestler
 March 7
 Ronan O'Gara, Irish rugby player
 Mitja Zastrow, German-born swimmer
 March 8 – James Van Der Beek, American actor
 March 9
 Bree Turner, American actress
 Peter Enckelman, Finnish footballer
 Shannon Miller, American gymnast
 March 10 – Robin Thicke, American-Canadian R&B singer-songwriter and actor
 March 11
 Becky Hammon, American basketball player
 Jason Greeley, Canadian singer
 March 14 
 Matthew Booth, South African footballer
 Naoki Matsuda, Japanese footballer (d. 2011)
 Kim Nam-il, South Korean footballer
 March 15 – Brian Tee, Japanese American actor
 March 16 – Mónica Cruz, Spanish actress and dancer
 March 18
 Arkady Babchenko, Russian journalist
 Zdeno Chára, Slovak ice hockey player
 Willy Sagnol, French football player and coach
 March 19 – Robert Lindstedt, Swedish tennis player
 March 24 – Jessica Chastain, American actress
 March 25 – Édgar Ramírez, Venezuelan actor
 March 26 – Bianca Kajlich, American actress
 March 27 – Vítor Meira, Brazilian racing driver
 March 28 – Annie Wersching, American actress (d. 2023)

April

 April 1
 Vitor Belfort, Brazilian mixed martial artist
 Paul Kalanithi, Indian-American neurosurgeon and writer (d. 2015)
 April 2 
 Michael Fassbender, Irish-German actor
 Nicki Pedersen, Danish motorcycle rider
 April 5
 Jonathan Erlich, Israeli tennis player
 Daniel Majstorović, Swedish soccer player
 April 8 – Mehran Ghassemi, Iranian journalist (d. 2008)
 April 9 – Gerard Way, American musician and comic book writer
 April 10 – Cristiano Zanetti, Italian footballer
 April 12 
 Tobias Angerer, German cross-country skier
 Gemma Mengual, Spanish synchronised swimmer
 April 14
 Sarah Michelle Gellar, American actress
 Nate Fox, American professional basketball player (d. 2014)
 Rob McElhenney, American actor
 April 15 – Dejan Milojevic, Serbian basketball player
 April 16 – Freddie Ljungberg, Swedish footballer
 April 17 – Frederik Magle, Danish composer, concert organist, and pianist
 April 21 – Jamie Salé, Canadian figure skater
 April 22
 Mark van Bommel, Dutch football player and coach
 Anna Eriksson, Finnish pop-rock singer
 Steven Price, British film composer
 April 23
 Arash, Iranian-Swedish singer, entertainer and producer
 John Cena, American professional wrestler, actor and rapper
 Kal Penn, American actor, producer, and former civil servant
 April 24
 Carlos Beltrán, Puerto Rican baseball player
 Rebecca Mader, English actress
 April 25 – Manolo Cardona, Colombian actor
 April 26
 Jason Earles, American actor, comedian, and martial artist
 Tom Welling, American actor, director, producer, and model
 April 30
 Alexandra Holden, American actress
 Ole Jørn Myklebust, Norwegian jazz musician

May

 May 3 – Ryan Dempster, Canadian baseball player
 May 4 – Emily Perkins, Canadian actress
 May 5
 Choi Kang-hee, South Korean actress
 Virginie Efira, Belgian actress and television anchor
 Jessica Schwarz, German film and television actress
 May 9 – Marek Jankulovski, Czech footballer
 May 10 – Nick Heidfeld, German racing driver
 May 11
 Janne Ahonen, Finnish ski jumper
 Victor Matfield, South African rugby player
 May 12
 Graeme Dott, Scottish snooker player
 Maryam Mirzakhani, Iranian mathematician (d. 2017)
 May 13 
 Samantha Morton, English actress
 Tarik Sektioui, Moroccan footballer
 May 14 – Roy Halladay, American baseball player (d. 2017)
 May 16
 Melanie Lynskey, New Zealand actress
 Emilíana Torrini, Icelandic singer
 May 23 
 Richard Ayoade, British actor and presenter
 Ilia Kulik, Russian figure skater
 Yevgeny Rodionov, Russian soldier (d. 1996)
 May 24 
 Jeet Gannguli, Indian singer, music director and score composer
 Tamarine Tanasugarn, Thai tennis player
 May 25 – Alberto Del Rio, Mexican professional wrestler
 May 26
 Misaki Ito, Japanese actress
 Luca Toni, Italian footballer
 May 27
 Abderrahmane Hammad, Algerian athlete
 Tommie van der Leegte, Dutch soccer player
 May 29 – Massimo Ambrosini, Italian football player
 May 31
 Domenico Fioravanti, Italian swimmer
 Joachim Olsen, Danish athlete and politician
 Moses Sichone, Zambian footballer

June

 June 1
 Sarah Wayne Callies, American actress
 Jónsi, Icelandic singer
 June 2 – Zachary Quinto, American actor
 June 7 
 Chen Luyun, Chinese basketball player (d. 2015)
 Donovan Ricketts, Jamaican footballer
 June 8 – Kanye West, American rapper and record producer
 June 9 – Peja Stojaković, Serbian basketball player
 June 11 
 Kim Hee-sun, South Korean actress
 Geoff Ogilvy, Australian golfer
 June 12 – Ana Tijoux, French-Chilean musician
 June 17 – Bartosz Brożek, Polish philosopher and jurist 
 June 18
 Kaja Kallas, 19th Prime Minister of Estonia
 Majed Moqed, Saudi Arabian terrorist (d. 2001)
 June 19
 Peter Warrick, American football player
 Veronika Vařeková, Czech model
 Maria Cioncan, distance runner from Romania (d. 2007)
 June 21 – Jochen Hecht, German ice hockey player
 June 23 – Jason Mraz, American singer-songwriter
 June 24 – Mal Michael, Papua New Guinean footballer
 June 25 
 Layla El, English dancer, model, and retired professional wrestler
 Naoya Tsukahara, Japanese gymnast
 June 26
 William Kipsang, Kenyan long-distance runner
 Tite Kubo, Japanese manga artist who created BLEACH
 June 27
 Arkadiusz Radomski, Polish footballer
 Raúl, Spanish footballer
 June 28 – Harun Tekin, Turkish rock vocalist and guitarist (Mor ve Ötesi)
 June 29 
 Jeff Baena, American screenwriter and film director
 Will Kemp, English actor and dancer
 Zuleikha Robinson, British actress and singer
 Bradley Stryker, American actor
 June 30 – Justo Villar, Paraguayan footballer

July

 July 1
 Tom Frager, French-born singer and surfer
 Liv Tyler, American actress
 July 2 – Carl Froch, British boxer
 July 5 – Nicolas Kiefer, German tennis player
 July 6 
 Audrey Fleurot, French actress
 Max Mirnyi, Belarusian tennis player
 July 8
 Maciej Jachowski, Polish actor and singer
 Belinda Lee, Singaporean television host and actress
 Milo Ventimiglia, American actor
 Wang Zhizhi, Chinese basketball player
 July 9 – Noppadol Sangnil, Thai snooker player
 July 10
 Cary Joji Fukunaga, American film director, writer, and cinematographer
 Chiwetel Ejiofor, English actor
 Li Zimeng, Chinese host
 July 11 
 Casper Crump, Danish actor
 Finau Maka, Tongan rugby union footballer
 July 12
 Steve Howey, American actor
 Brock Lesnar, American professional wrestler and former mixed martial artist
 July 13 
 Jonah Lotan, Israeli actor
 Kari Wahlgren, American voice actress
 July 14 – Victoria, Crown Princess of Sweden
 July 15 – Lana Parrilla, American actress
 July 18
 Alfian Sa'at, Singaporean writer, poet and playwright
 Alexander Morozevich, Russian chess Grandmaster
 Alfian bin Sa'at, Singaporean writer, poet and playwright
 July 21 
 Paul Casey, English golfer
 Allison Wagner, American swimmer
 July 24 
 Danny Dyer, English actor
 Mehdi Mahdavikia, Iranian football player
 July 26 – Rebecca St. James, Australian-born Christian musician
 July 27 – Jonathan Rhys Meyers, Irish actor
 July 28 – Manu Ginóbili, Argentine basketball player
 July 30 – Jaime Pressly, American actress

August

 August 2 – Edward Furlong, American actor
 August 3 – Tom Brady, American football player and entrepreneur
 August 5 – David Chang, American restaurateur and author
 August 8 – Marílson Gomes dos Santos, Brazilian long-distance runner
 August 9 –  Chamique Holdsclaw, American basketball player
 August 12 
 Jesper Grønkjær, Danish footballer
 Iva Majoli, Croatian tennis player
 August 13 – Michael Klim, Australian swimmer
 August 15
 Martin Biron, Canadian hockey player
 Igor Cassina, Italian gymnast
 August 16 – Tamer Hosny, Egyptian singer-songwriter and actor
 August 17
 Tarja Turunen, Finnish operatic soprano
 Thierry Henry, French footballer
 William Gallas, French footballer
 August 18 – Lukáš Bauer, Czech cross-country skier
 August 20
 Felipe Contepomi, Argentine rugby player
 Manuel Contepomi, Argentine rugby player
 Henning Stensrud, Norwegian ski jumper
 August 24
 Denílson, Brazilian footballer
 Jürgen Macho, Austrian footballer
 John Green, American author, vlogger, and editor
 Robert Enke, German footballer (d. 2009)
 August 27 – Deco, Brazilian born-Portuguese footballer
 August 30
 Jens Ludwig, German guitarist
 Félix Sánchez, American-Dominican athlete
 August 31
 Jeff Hardy, American professional wrestler
 Ian Harte, Irish footballer

September

 September 1 
 David Albelda, Spanish footballer
 Kathleen de Leon Jones, Filipino-Australian actress, dancer, singer and television performer (Hi-5)
 September 2
 Frédéric Kanouté, Malian soccer player
 Elitsa Todorova, Bulgarian singer-songwriter

 September 4 – Lucie Silvas, English singer
 September 5 – Sin Cara, Mexican-American professional wrestler
 September 6 – Katalin Novák, Hungarian politician
 September 9 – Soulja Slim, American rapper (d. 2003)
 September 11 – Ludacris, American rapper and actor
 September 12 
 2 Chainz, American rapper
 James McCartney, English musician and songwriter
 Idan Raichel, Israeli singer-songwriter
 September 13 – Fiona Apple, American singer
 September 15
 Chimamanda Ngozi Adichie, Nigerian author
 Angela Aki, Japanese singer-songwriter
 Tom Hardy, English actor
 Jason Terry, American basketball player
 September 18 – Kieran West, British Olympic oarsman
 September 20 – Namie Amuro, Japanese singer
 September 21 – Marc de Hond, Dutch television presenter and wheelchair basketball player (d. 2020) 
 September 22 – Paul Sculthorpe, English rugby league player
 September 23 – Suzanne Tamim, Lebanese singer, actress, and murder victim (d. 2008)
 September 24 – Kabeer Gbaja-Biamila, American football player
 September 25
 Clea DuVall, American actress
 Joel David Moore, American actor
 September 27 – Andrus Värnik, Estonian javelin thrower
 September 28
 Se-Ri Pak, South Korean golfer
 Kristal Tin, Hong Kong actress
 September 30
 Roy Carroll, Irish footballer
 Sun Jihai, Chinese footballer

October

 October 2 – Didier Défago, Swiss Olympic alpine skier
 October 3 – Antonio Di Natale, Italian football player and coach
 October 4 – Najat Vallaud-Belkacem, French politician
 October 6 – Daniel Brière, Canadian ice hockey player
 October 8 – Anne-Caroline Chausson, French mountain bicycle racer
 October 11
 Matt Bomer, American film, stage, and television actor
 Claudia Palacios, Colombian journalist and newsreader
 October 12 – Bode Miller, American skier
 October 13
 Paul Pierce, American basketball player
 Kiele Sanchez, American actress 
 October 14
 Kelly Schumacher, American basketball and volleyball player
 Oleg Velyky, Ukrainian and German handball player World champion 2007 (d. 2010)
 October 15 – David Trezeguet, French footballer
 October 16 – John Mayer, American musician and record producer
 October 17
 Dudu Aouate, Israeli footballer
 André Villas-Boas, Portuguese football manager
 October 18
 Jyothika, Indian actress
 Ryan Nelsen, New Zealand footballer
 Peter Sohn, American animator, voice actor, storyboard artist, and film director
 Paul Stalteri, Canadian footballer
 October 19 – Raúl Tamudo, Spanish footballer
 October 25 – Birgit Prinz, German footballer
 October 26
 Jon Heder, American actor and voice artist 
 Louis Crayton, Swiss/Liberian footballer
 October 27 – Kumar Sangakkara, Sri Lankan cricketer
 October 28 – Jonas Rasmussen, Danish badminton player
 October 29 – Brendan Fehr, Canadian actor

November

 November 10 – Brittany Murphy, American actress and singer (d. 2009)
 November 11 
 Maniche, Portuguese footballer
 Scoot McNairy, American actor
 November 13 – Huang Xiaoming, Chinese actor and singer
 November 15 – Sean Murray, American actor
 November 16
 Oksana Baiul, Ukrainian figure skater
 Maggie Gyllenhaal, American actress
 November 17 – Ryk Neethling, South African swimmer
 November 18 – Trent Barrett, Australian rugby league player
 November 19
 Mette Frederiksen, Danish politician
 Kerri Strug, American gymnast
 November 20 – Daniel Svensson, Swedish drummer
 November 21 – Tobias Sammet, German singer and songwriter
 November 24 – Colin Hanks, American actor
 November 28 – Fabio Grosso, Italian football player and coach
 November 30 – Nelsan Ellis, African-American film and television actor and playwright (d. 2017)

December

 December 1 – Brad Delson, American musician (Linkin Park)
 December 2 – Nancy Mace, American politician
 December 6 – Andrew Flintoff, English cricketer
 December 7 – Luke Donald, English golfer
 December 8
 Elsa Benítez, Mexican model and television host
 Sébastien Chabal, French rugby union player
 Ryan Newman, American race car driver
 Matthias Schoenaerts, Belgian actor and producer
 December 10 – Andrea Henkel, German professional biathlete
 December 11 – Peter Stringer, Irish rugby union player
 December 12 – Adam Saitiev, Chechen wrestler, Olympic gold medalist
 December 16
 Anu Nieminen, Finnish badminton player
 René Redzepi, Danish chef
 December 17 – Oxana Fedorova, Russian model
 December 20 – Sonja Aldén, Swedish pop singer
 December 21
 Gregor Horvatič, Slovenian politician
 Emmanuel Macron, 25th President of France 
 December 23 – Jari Mäenpää, Finnish musician
 December 24 – Domingo Vega, also known as Américo, Chilean singer
 December 25 – Uhm Ji-won, South Korean actress
 December 30
 Laila Ali, American boxer
 Kenyon Martin, American basketball player
 December 31 
 Psy, South Korean singer, songwriter, rapper, dancer and record producer
 Donald Trump Jr., American businessman and son of former U.S. President Donald Trump

Deaths

January 

 January 2 – Erroll Garner, American musician (b. 1921)
 January 4 – Ibrahim Biçakçiu, Albanian politician, 2-time Prime Minister of Albania leader of World War II (b. 1905)
 January 5 – Artur Adson, Estonian poet, writer and theatre critic (b. 1889)
 January 14
 Anthony Eden, British politician, 62nd Prime Minister of the United Kingdom (b. 1897)
 Peter Finch, English-born actor (b. 1916)
 Anaïs Nin, French diarist and writer (b. 1903)
 January 17 – Gary Gilmore, American murderer (b. 1940)
 January 18
 Džemal Bijedić, Yugoslavian politician, 27th Prime Minister of Yugoslavia (b. 1917)
 Carl Zuckmayer, German writer and playwright  (b. 1896)
 January 19 – Yvonne Printemps, French singer and actress (b. 1894)
 January 20 – Dimitrios Kiousopoulos, Prime Minister of Greece (b. 1892)
 January 23 – Pascual Pérez, Argentine world Flyweight boxing champion (b. 1926)
 January 26 – Dietrich von Hildebrand, German philosopher and theologian (b. 1889)
 January 28 – Burt Mustin, American actor (b. 1884)
 January 29 – Freddie Prinze, American actor and comedian (b. 1954)

February

 February 3 – Pauline Starke, American actress (b. 1901)
 February 4 – Brett Halliday, American writer (b. 1904)
 February 5 – Oskar Klein, Swedish theoretical physicist (b. 1894)
 February 9 – Alia Al-Hussein, Queen consort of Jordan (b. 1948)
 February 15 – Herman Johannes Lam, Dutch botanist (b. 1892)
 February 16 
 Rózsa Péter, Hungarian mathematician (b. 1905)
 Carlos Pellicer, Mexican poet (b. 1897)
 February 27 – John Dickson Carr, American crime novelist (b. 1906)

March

 March 1 – Diallo Telli, Guinean diplomat and politician, 1st Secretary General of the Organisation of African Unity (b. 1925)
 March 3
 Brian Faulkner, last Prime Minister of Northern Ireland (b. 1921)
 Percy Marmont, American stage and screen actor (b. 1883)
 March 4 
 Andrés Caicedo, Colombian writer (b. 1951)
 Lutz Graf Schwerin von Krosigk, German jurist and senior government official, last führer of Nazi Germany (b. 1887)
 March 5 – Tom Pryce, British Formula One racing driver (b. 1949)
 March 8 – Henry Hull, American actor (b. 1890)
 March 10
 E. Power Biggs, English-American organist (b. 1906)
 Willem Schermerhorn, Dutch politician and civil engineer, 28th Prime Minister of the Netherlands (b. 1894)
 March 14 – Fannie Lou Hamer, American civil rights activist (b. 1917)
 March 15 – Antonino Rocca, Italian professional wrestler (b. 1921)
 March 17 – Claude Roger-Marx, French writer, and playwright (b. 1888)
 March 18 – Marien Ngouabi, 3rd President of Congo (b. 1938)
 March 19 – William L. Laurence, Jewish Lithuanian-American journalist (b. 1888)
 March 20 – Charles Lyttelton, 10th Viscount Cobham, English politician, 9th Governor-General of New Zealand (b. 1909)
 March 29 – Eugen Wüster, industrialist and terminologist (b. 1898)
 March 30 – Abdel Halim Hafez, Egyptian singer and actor (b. 1929)

April 

 April 2 – John Whitaker, British gymnast (b. 1886)
 April 5 – Carlos Prío Socarrás, 11th President of Cuba (b. 1903)
 April 7 – Karl Ritter, German film producer and director (b. 1888)
 April 11 – Jacques Prévert, French poet and screenwriter (b. 1900)
 April 17 – William Conway, Northern Irish cardinal (b. 1913)
 April 20
 Wilmer Allison, American tennis champion (b. 1904)
 Bryan Foy, American film producer and director (b. 1896)
 April 21 – Gummo Marx, American actor and comedian (b. 1892)
 April 27
 Stanley Adams, American actor (b. 1915)
 Charles Alston, American artist and sculptor (b. 1907)
 April 28
 Ricardo Cortez, American actor (b. 1899)
 Sepp Herberger, German footballer and manager (b. 1897)

May

 May 5 – Ludwig Erhard, German politician, 28th Chancellor of Germany (West Germany) (b. 1897)
 May 7 – Prince Xavier of Bourbon-Parma, Spanish Carlist pretender (b. 1889)
 May 9 – James Jones, American writer (b. 1921)
 May 10 – Joan Crawford, American actress (b. c. 1904)
 May 13 – Otto Deßloch, German World War II Luftwaffe general (b. 1889)
 May 15 – Herbert Wilcox, British film director and producer (b. 1892)
 May 16 – Modibo Keïta, 1st President of Mali (b. 1915)
 May 25 – Willoughby Norrie, British army general and Governor-General of New Zealand (b. 1893)
 May 31 – William Castle, American film director (b. 1914)

June

 June 2 – Stephen Boyd, Northern Irish actor (b. 1931)
 June 3
 Archibald Hill, English physiologist, Nobel Prize laureate (b. 1886)
 Roberto Rossellini, Italian film director (b. 1906)
 June 13 – Matthew Garber, English child actor (b. 1956)
 June 14 – Alan Reed, American actor (b. 1907)
 June 16 – Wernher von Braun, American-German aerospace engineer (b. 1912)
 June 22 – Marston Morse, American mathematician (b. 1892)
 June 25 – Olave Baden-Powell, founder of Scouting and Girl Guides (b. 1889)
 June 26 – Sergei Lemeshev, Russian operatic lyric tenor (b. 1902)
 June 30 – Paul Hartmann, American actor (b. 1889)

July

 July 2 – Vladimir Nabokov, Russian-born American writer (b. 1899)
 July 9 – Alice Paul, American women's rights activist (b. 1885)
 July 15 – Konstantin Fedin, Russian writer (b. 1892)
 July 20 – Carter DeHaven, American actor (b. 1886)
 July 25 – David Toro,  35th President of Bolivia (b. 1898)
 July 26 – Prince Charles of Luxembourg, Prince of Luxembourg (b. 1927)
 July 30 – Jean de Laborde, French admiral (b. 1878)
 July 31 – Giuseppe Castellano, Italian general (b. 1893)

August

 August 1 – Francis Gary Powers, American U-2 spy plane pilot (b. 1929)
 August 2 – Manuel Gonçalves Cerejeira, Portuguese Roman Catholic cardinal (b. 1888)
 August 3
 Alfred Lunt, American actor (b. 1892)
 Makarios III, Greek-Cypriot archbishop, 1st President of Cyprus (b. 1913)
 August 4 
 Edgar Adrian, 1st Baron Adrian, English physiologist, Nobel Prize laureate (b. 1889)
 Ernst Bloch, German Marxist philosopher (b. 1885)
 August 6 – Alexander Bustamante, Jamaican politician, 1st Prime Minister of Jamaica (b. 1884)
 August 8 – Son Ngoc Thanh, 2nd Prime Minister of Cambodia (b. 1908)
 August 13 – Henry Williamson, English naturalist, farmer and prolific ruralist (b. 1895)
 August 16 – Elvis Presley, American actor, musician and singer-songwriter (b. 1935)
 August 17 – Delmer Daves, American screenwriter and director (b. 1904)
 August 19 – Groucho Marx, American actor and comedian (b. 1890) 
 August 22 – Sebastian Cabot, English actor (b. 1918)
 August 23 – Naum Gabo, Russian sculptor (b. 1890)
 August 29 – Jean Hagen, American actress (b. 1923)

September

 September 1 – Ethel Waters, American singer and actress (b. 1896)
 September 4 – E. F. Schumacher, German statistician and economist (b. 1885)
 September 6 – John Edensor Littlewood, British mathematician (b. 1885)
 September 8 – Zero Mostel, American actor (b. 1915)
September 10 - Adolph Rupp, American college basketball coach (b. 1901)  
 September 12 – Steve Biko, South African anti-apartheid activist (b. 1946)
 September 13 – Leopold Stokowski, English conductor (b. 1882)
 September 16
 Marc Bolan, British singer and guitarist (b. 1947)
 Maria Callas, Greek soprano  (b. 1923)
 September 18 – Paul Bernays, Swiss mathematician (b. 1888)
 September 29 – Robert McKimson, American animator and director (b. 1910)

October

 October 3 – Tay Garnett, American film director (b. 1894)
 October 10 – Jean Duvieusart, Belgian politician, 36th Prime Minister of Belgium (b. 1900)
 October 12 – Dorothy Davenport, American actress (b. 1895)
 October 14 – Bing Crosby, American pop singer and actor (b. 1903)
 October 17 – Sir Michael Balcon, English film producer (b. 1896)
 October 20 – Three members of American rock group, Lynyrd Skynyrd, killed in plane crash:
 Ronnie Van Zant, lead singer (b. 1948)
 Cassie Gaines, lead singer (b. 1948)
 Steve Gaines, lead singer and guitarist (b. 1949)
 October 25 – Félix Gouin, French Socialist politician (b. 1884)
 October 27 
 James M. Cain, American writer (b. 1892)
 Miguel Mihura, Spanish playwright (b. 1905)

November

 November 3 – Florence Vidor, American actress (b. 1895)
 November 4 – Betty Balfour, English screen actress (b. 1902)
 November 5
 René Goscinny, French comic book writer (b. 1926)
 Guy Lombardo, Canadian-American bandleader (b. 1902)
 November 9 – Gertrude Astor, American actress (b. 1887)
 November 10 – Dennis Wheatley, English writer (b. 1897)
 November 14
 A. C. Bhaktivedanta Swami Prabhupada, Indian religious leader (b. 1896)
 Ferdinand Heim, German general, branded the "Scapegoat of Stalingrad" (b. 1897)
 November 15 – Princess Charlotte of Monaco (b. 1898)
 November 18
 Victor Francen, Belgian actor (b. 1888)
 Kurt Schuschnigg, 11th Chancellor of Austria (b. 1897)
 November 21 – Richard Carlson, American actor (b. 1912)
 November 30 – Olga Petrova, English-born American actress (b. 1884)

December 

 December 3 – Jack Beresford, British Olympic rower (b. 1899)
 December 5 – Aleksandr Vasilevsky, Soviet general, Marshal of the Soviet Union (b. 1895)
 December 12 – Clementine Churchill, wife of Winston Churchill (b. 1885)
 December 16 
 Gustaf Aulén, Bishop of Strängnäs in the Church of Sweden (b. 1879)
 Yngve Larsson, Swedish statesman (b. 1881)
 December 19
 Takeo Kurita, Japanese admiral (b. 1889)
 Nellie Tayloe Ross, American politician (b. 1876)
 December 24 – Juan Velasco Alvarado, 58th President of Peru (b. 1910)
 December 25 – Sir Charlie Chaplin, British actor, producer and director (b. 1889)
 December 26 – Howard Hawks, American film director (b. 1896)
 December 28 – Charlotte Greenwood, American actress (b. 1890)

Nobel Prizes 

 Physics – Philip Warren Anderson, Sir Nevill Francis Mott, John Hasbrouck Van Vleck
 Chemistry – Ilya Prigogine
 Physiology or Medicine – Roger Guillemin, Andrew Schally, Rosalyn Yalow
 Literature – Vicente Aleixandre
 Peace – Amnesty International
 Economics – Bertil Ohlin, James Meade

References